Anton Hansch (born 24 March 1813 in Vienna; died 8 December 1876 in Salzburg) was an Austrian landscape painter.

Biography
He was a pupil of Josef Mössmer at the Academy of Vienna, and afterwards traveled and studied in Germany, Belgium, Switzerland, and Italy. His works consist of landscapes remarkable for composition and careful detail.

Works
 “Region Bordering on the Königsee” (1849)
 “The Jungfrau in Switzerland” (1853)
 “Under the Linden Trees on the Shore of Chiem Lake” (1858)
 “The Lake of Constance”
 “Firwood in the Salzkammergut”
 “From the Wilderness of Styria”
 “At Bernina Pass”
 “After the Storm”
 “The Wetterhorn”

Notes

References
 

1813 births
1876 deaths
19th-century Austrian painters
Austrian male painters
Austrian landscape painters
Academy of Fine Arts Vienna alumni
19th-century Austrian male artists